Archibald Lyle (10 February 1886–unknown) was a Scottish footballer who played for Tottenham Hotspur.

Football career
Lyle, an inside right played one match for Tottenham Hotspur in 1909.

References 

1886 births
Scottish footballers
Footballers from Glasgow
English Football League players
Tottenham Hotspur F.C. players
Year of death missing
Association football forwards
People from Maryhill